Stanley Orme, Baron Orme, PC (5 April 1923 – 27 April 2005) was a British left-wing Labour Party politician. He was a Member of Parliament (MP) from 1964 to 1997, and served as a cabinet minister in the 1970s.

Early life
Stan Orme was born in Sale, Cheshire. He was educated at a technical school, which he left in 1938 to become an instrument maker's apprentice.
He joined the RAF in 1942, becoming a bomber-navigator, serving in Canada and Egypt. He was demobilised in 1947 as a warrant officer.

Political career
Orme joined the Labour Party in 1944 and he became a Sale Borough Councillor in 1958. A committed Bevanite, he embraced many left-wing causes, including the Movement for Colonial Freedom and the Campaign for Nuclear Disarmament.

He first stood for Parliament in Stockport South at the 1959 general election, when he lost to the Conservative candidate. He was elected as Member of Parliament (MP) for Salford West at the 1964 general election.

When Labour returned to office at the February 1974 general election, Orme was installed at Stormont as Minister of State for Northern Ireland. He made an impression in this role, before moving to the Department of Health and Social Security in March 1976. The Prime Minister James Callaghan promoted him to the Cabinet in September 1976 to sit alongside his departmental boss David Ennals. He remained in this role until 1979.

Orme joined the Shadow Cabinet in 1979 as chief health and social security spokesman, before later moving on to hold the Industry and Energy portfolios until 1987.
After constituency boundary changes for the 1983 general election, he was elected for the redrawn seat of Salford East.
He served as the Chairman of the Parliamentary Labour Party (1987–1992). He retired from the House of Commons at the 1997 general election, and he was created a life peer as Baron Orme, of Salford in the County of Greater Manchester on 21 October 1997.

Orme was a republican. He made several unsuccessful attempts to be elected to Labour's National Executive Committee, without breaking through.

Lord Orme died 22 days after his birthday on April 27, 2005. His funeral at Dunham Crematorium was attended by many family, friends and political colleagues. A memorial service was held in the House of Lords, with speeches from Neil Kinnock and Michael Foot. A very rare exception was made by the Lord Chancellor such that any Divisions were suspended during this evening service.

Private life
In 1951 he married Irene Mary Harris (died 2022). They had no children.

Controversy
In December 2019, a Daily Telegraph investigation reported that Orme had been involved in handing confidential information to Czech communist spies.

References

Times Guide to the House of Commons, Times Newspapers Limited, 1992
Obituary, The Times obituaries.
 Catalogue of the Orme papers at the Archives Division of the London School of Economics.

External links 
 

|-

|-

|-

1923 births
2005 deaths
Amalgamated Engineering Union-sponsored MPs
English republicans
Councillors in Greater Manchester
Members of the Privy Council of the United Kingdom
Labour Party (UK) MPs for English constituencies
Labour Party (UK) life peers
Life peers created by Elizabeth II
People from Sale, Greater Manchester
UK MPs 1964–1966
UK MPs 1966–1970
UK MPs 1970–1974
UK MPs 1974
UK MPs 1974–1979
UK MPs 1979–1983
UK MPs 1983–1987
UK MPs 1987–1992
UK MPs 1992–1997
Royal Air Force personnel of World War II
Royal Air Force airmen
Northern Ireland Office junior ministers
Members of the Parliament of the United Kingdom for Salford West